David Alton Ure (October 9, 1910 – December 23, 1953) was a provincial politician from Alberta, Canada. He served as a member of the Legislative Assembly of Alberta from 1944 to 1953, sitting with the Social Credit caucus in government. He was killed in a head-on traffic collision with a truck in 1953.

References

Alberta Social Credit Party MLAs
1953 deaths
1910 births